Jean-Marie Guastavino (1 April 1886 - 26 August 1960) was a French politician.

Guastavino was born in Algiers, Algeria. He represented the Independent Radicals (from 1932 to 1936) and the Radical Party (from 1936 to 1940) in the Chamber of Deputies.

References

External links
 

1886 births
1960 deaths
People from Algiers
People of French Algeria
Pieds-Noirs
Independent Radical politicians
Radical Party (France) politicians
Members of the 15th Chamber of Deputies of the French Third Republic
Members of the 16th Chamber of Deputies of the French Third Republic
French military personnel of World War I